The music video for American singer Mýa's 2017 song "Coolin'" was directed by local Australian director Matt Sharp. It was filmed in early January 2017 in Sydney, Australia at the QT luxury boutique hotel. The video premiered on February 14, 2017 via Vibe.com and made available for purchase the same day.

The video begins with a monologue given by Mýa. Scenes included in the video depicts Harrison and her love interest (Marco Santelli) frolicking on the beach and Harrison sulking in reflection of her past love in bathtub and hotel suite.

Background and development

The music video for Coolin was shot January 8–9, 2017 in Sydney, Australia at the QT Hotel. A two day shoot, it was filmed after the completion of the singer's Australian leg of her Smoove Jones Show Tour (2016). While on tour in Australia, Harrison began a search for a music director. Subsequently, she was introduced to Matt Sharp, a local Australian director. Satisfied with Sharp's work, Harrison hired and appointed him in charge of shooting the music video. For the shoot, the singer enlisted an entire Australian team and was styled by Aussie designers such as Alice McCall, Kaliver, Baby Likes To Pony, Dejna Kantarevic, Jacinta James; topped off with Tessarella House Jewellery.

Synopsis
The video begins with an opening monologue by Harrison reflecting on a past love. Produced in black and white, the music video shows the singer in lingerie in one of QT Sydney's beautiful, luxe state suite, immersed in reflection about a past love and their time together.

Release
Like always and in honor of her nineteenth anniversary, the singer decided to gift her fans with a special treat. To commemorate this year anniversary, Mýa released a new music video for fan favorite Coolin' off the Smoove Jones project. Prior to the video's release, the singer uploaded a teaser clip on her Instagram account. The video for Coolin' officially premiered on the Vibe.com website on February 14, 2017. It premiered on InStyle website as well. Additionally, the music video was made available for purchase via iTunes.

 Credits Video credits Matt Sharp – direction
 Julian McGruther – production
 Joe Dadic – creative direction and styling 
 Tatjana Vaune – make-up and hair
 Ed Reiss – cinematographer
 Jackson Drew – underwater camera
 Mýa – narration, starring role
 Marco Santelli – starring roleSong credits'
 Mýa – vocals, songwriting, engineering
 Nikki Flores – songwriting
 T-Town Productions – producer 
 Tom Kahre – engineering
 Rome Palermo – mixing

Release history

References

External links
 

2010s music videos
Mýa
2010s English-language films